Natalee is a female given name. It is a variant of the name Natalie, though uncommon according to the U.S. Census Bureau. Notable people with the name include:

Natalee Caple (born 1970), Canadian author of novels and poetry
Natalee Holloway (born 1986), American who disappeared in Aruba in May 2005
Natalee Scripps (born 1978), New Zealand cricketer

See also
Loving Natalee: A Mother's Testament of Hope and Faith, a 2007 American book about the disappearance of Natalee Holloway
Natalee Holloway (film), a 2009 American television film about the disappearance of Holloway
Nathalie
Natalia (disambiguation)
Natty (disambiguation)
Natasha

Notes

Feminine given names